Cirrhilabrus adornatus is a species of the labrid fish genus Cirrhilabrus and is also known as the red-fin fairy wrasse or Debelius fairy wrasse. They are found in the Eastern Indian Ocean which is known only from Indonesia (Sumatra and the Mentawai Islands) over a rubble bottom of 1212m. Male Cirrhilabrus adornatus have two large triangular bright red blotches on the body which are white to pale pink.  Female with a black spot three-fourths orbit diameter posteriorly on side of caudal peduncle and shading to white ventrally on head and abdomen. They are small species with a height of 63.4 mm SL, body depth 2.9-3.2 in SL, and head length 2.75-3.05 in SL. Cirrhilabrus adornatus is the combination of 45–47 dorsal-fin rays, 28–30 anal fin rays, 50–52 total vertebrae, 51–54 lateral line scales, 8–12 cheek scales, two large scales on each side of the lower jaw undersurface.

References 

adornatus
Fish described in 1998